is a railway station in the town of Kanegasaki, Iwate Prefecture, Japan, operated by East Japan Railway Company (JR East).

Lines
Kanegasaki Station is served by the Tōhoku Main Line, and is located 477.7 rail kilometers from the terminus of the line at Tokyo Station.

Station layout
The station is an elevated station and has two opposed side platforms.  The station is staffed.

Platforms

History
Kanegasaki Station was opened on 1 July 1897. The station was absorbed into the JR East network upon the privatization of the Japanese National Railways (JNR) on 1 April 1987. A new station building was completed in November 2004.

Passenger statistics
In fiscal 2018, the station was used by an average of 584 passengers daily (boarding passengers only).

Surrounding area
 Kanegasaki Town Hall
Isawa River
Kitakami River
 
Tōhoku Expressway

See also
 List of Railway Stations in Japan

References

External links

  

Railway stations in Iwate Prefecture
Tōhoku Main Line
Railway stations in Japan opened in 1897
Kanegasaki, Iwate
Stations of East Japan Railway Company